Remover may refer to:

Adhesive remover
Staple remover
Paint remover
Nail polish remover
Needle remover
Lint remover

See also
The Removers, spy novel by Donald Hamilton first published in 1961